

The Genesis 2 is a Standard Class competition glider that was designed by an American team led by Jerry Mercer. It was produced in Lithuania. It is notable in having almost no rear fuselage. However it is not tailless, because it has a small, all-moving tailplane on top of the vertical stabilizer. The tailplane is mainly a trimmer, rather than for longitudinal stability.

Development
During development it was found that carbon rods formed by the "pultrusion" process could be used to provide a stronger spar. This technique has subsequently been applied to other LAK aircraft. The nosewheel was also made retractable and the wing washout was reduced. The production aircraft with these modifications, which flew in 1998, were called "Genesis 2". There was a breakdown in relations between the American design group and the manufacturers, and so production was stopped after 27 had been made.

Specifications (Genesis 2)

References

External links

LAK web-site

Marske aircraft
Glider aircraft
LAK aircraft
Aircraft first flown in 1994
T-tail aircraft
Mid-wing aircraft